André Pactat was a French rower. He competed in the men's coxless pair event at the 1928 Summer Olympics.

References

External links

Year of birth missing
Possibly living people
French male rowers
Olympic rowers of France
Rowers at the 1928 Summer Olympics
Place of birth missing